Hemiscorpius is the sole genus of the scorpion family Hemiscorpiidae, with about 16 described species. Before Hemiscorpiidae, the term used for the family was Ischnuridae, which had to be changed due to a naming conflict with the damselfly family of the same name. They at one point also held the name Liochelidae.

In 2015, research on the evolution, biogeography and phylogeny of the families Hormuridae, Hemiscorpiidae, and Heteroscorpionidae left Hemiscorpiidae with a single genus, Hemiscorpius, the remaining 15 merged or transferred to other families.

Description
Most species of Hemiscorpius have a very flat and broad body plan, due to their main habitat in tight rock crevices.

Distribution
Hemiscorpius is distributed throughout the Middle East and Indomalaya.

Human interaction
Hemiscorpius has a strong venom; especially that of Hemiscorpius lepturus can result in deadly accidents.

Species
These 17 species belong to the genus Hemiscorpius:

 Hemiscorpius acanthocercus Monod & Lourenço, 2005
 Hemiscorpius arabicus Pocock, 1899
 Hemiscorpius egyptiensis Lourenço, 2011
 Hemiscorpius enischnochela Monod & Lourenço, 2005
 Hemiscorpius falcifer Lowe, 2010
 Hemiscorpius flagelliraptor Loewe, 2010
 Hemiscorpius gaillardi (Vachon, 1974)
 Hemiscorpius hierichonticus Simon, 1872
 Hemiscorpius kashkayi Karatas & Gharkheloo, 2013
 Hemiscorpius lepturus Peters, 1861
 Hemiscorpius maindroni Kraepelin, 1900
 Hemiscorpius novaki Kovarik & Mazuch, 2011
 Hemiscorpius persicus Birula, 1903
 Hemiscorpius shahii Kovarík & Navidpour, 2017
 Hemiscorpius socotranus Pocock, 1899
 Hemiscorpius somalicus Lourenço, 2011
 Hemiscorpius tellinii Borelli, 1904

References

Scorpion genera
 
Taxa named by Wilhelm Peters